The New South Wales Rugby League Team of the Century is a hypothetical team comprising the best players who have played for New South Wales to form a team for 1908 until 2007. Rugby league in New South Wales was initiated in 1908 with the New South Wales Rugby Football League competition, which evolved into the New South Wales Rugby League in 1984. Today, ten New South Wales clubs participate in the national competition while thirteen formerly did so.

The team was announced on 19 May 2008, ahead of the first State of Origin game in Sydney.

The team

Notes

 The position the player were chosen in the Team of the Century.
 The Australian clubs/teams the player played for during his career.
 The number of games he played at state level for New South Wales during his career.
 The number of games he played at national level for Australia during his career.
 The Clubs, New South Wales and Australia columns are in terms of his coaching career, not his playing career.

References

Century